The Slovenia national badminton team represents Slovenia in international badminton team competitions. The Badminton Association of Slovenia organizes any event or national event in the national team. Slovenia competed in the Sudirman Cup until 2007. The men's and women's team also participate in the European meet.

The Slovenian team also competes in the Mediterranean Games.

Participation in BWF competitions

Sudirman Cup

Participation in European Team Badminton Championships

Men's Team

Women's Team

Mixed Team

Participation in Mediterranean Games 
The Slovenian badminton team has won four bronzes in the Mediterranean Games.

List of medalists

Participation in European Junior Team Badminton Championships
Mixed Team

Current squad 
The following players were selected to represent Slovenia at the 2020 European Men's and Women's Team Badminton Championships.

Male players
Andraž Krapež
Jaka Ivančič
Miha Ivančič
Gasper Krivec
Rok Jercinovic
Tilen Zalar

Female players
Iza Šalehar
Nika Arih
Lia Šalehar
Petra Polanc
Kaja Stanković
Nina Kotar

References

Badminton
National badminton teams
Badminton in Slovenia